Thandikulam railway station ( Tāṇṭikkuḷam toṭaruntu nilaiyam) is a railway station in the town of Thandikulam in northern Sri Lanka. Owned by Sri Lanka Railways, the state-owned railway operator, the station is part of the Northern Line which links the north with the capital Colombo. The popular Yarl Devi service calls at the station. The station was not functioning between 1990 and 2009 due to the civil war. It was re-opened on 6 June 2009.

References

Railway stations in Vavuniya District
Railway stations on the Northern Line (Sri Lanka)